The "Challenge of Champions" was created to be one of the richest prize money men's tennis events in the world. It was an invitation only tennis exhibition featuring daily matches with eight of the leading male players in the world according to their ATP rankings. The tournament was discontinued after the 1989 edition.

Past finals

 Held twice during the 1986 calendar year like the Nabisco Masters

References 
World of Tennis annuals

External links 

Tennis tournaments in the United States
Exhibition tennis tournaments
Carpet court tennis tournaments
Clay court tennis tournaments